Roja Parish is an administrative unit of Talsi Municipality in the Courland region of Latvia. From 2009 until 2021, it was part of the former Roja Municipality.

Towns, villages and settlements of Roja parish

References 

Parishes of Latvia
Talsi Municipality
Courland